Q Radio was an online, DAB and DTV radio station, broadcasting on digital television across the UK and online. The station launched in June 2008 as an alternative to the UK's rock and alternative stations, with a strong relationship with Q magazine. The station formed part of the Bauer Passion Portfolio. Coinciding with the launch of Kiss spin-off stations Kisstory and Kiss Fresh, Q Radio closed on 7 May 2013.

History
After running for several years as an online digital jukebox, former controller of BBC 6 Music and Capital Radio, and Top of the Pops executive producer Ric Blaxill was recruited to form a full station. 

Q Radio launched on DAB in London on 2 June 2008 with a full schedule including Samanthi (formerly of XFM and BBC2's "Desi DNA") and comedian and 2008 If.comeddies nominee Russell Kane. Co-founder of Acid Jazz records Eddie Piller also presented a weekly show and musician Billy Bragg presented a monthly programme.

The station launched with a Coldplay interview with Samanthi on QPM, where Chris Martin revealed that the band planned to release sessions with Kylie Minogue. Other guests in interview and sessions between June 2008 to March 2009 included Lily Allen, Kim Deal, Jane Birkin, Pete Shelley, The Futureheads, The Young Knives, White Lies, Ladyhawke and We Are Scientists. The first song played live on the station was Rocks by Primal Scream. 

The station relaunched in April 2009 with a new playlist and all-new line-up. It moved to Kerrang! Radio's headquarters in Birmingham, West Midlands and was run by Kerrang! Radio's programming team. The playlist itself was managed by James Walshe and Loz Guest, both of whom also ran the playlist at Kerrang! Radio.

In May 2009, the station was removed from Virgin Media and Sky, along with The Hits Radio, Heat Radio, Smash Hits Radio and Kerrang! Radio. 

In May 2010, it was taken off DAB. Although cost of carriage on DAB was suspected, the reason given by Bauer Media was: "At this stage of its development, it has become clear that Q Radio is best served by having national coverage on Freeview and online."

Coinciding with the launch of Kiss spin-off stations Kisstory and KissFresh, Q Radio closed on 7 May 2013.

Former presenters

Samanthi
Russell Kane
Eddie Piller
The Broken Hearts
Billy Bragg
David Quantick
Mark Somers
Lynsey Hooper
Adam Catterall
Phil Marriott
Allan Lake
Dave Everly
Ted Kessler
Jim Coulson
Dan Morfitt
Simon Hill
Craig Pilling
Luke Wilkins
Amy Jones
Emma Scott
Stuart Cable
Henry Evans
James Everton
Matt Stocks
Simon James
Pete Allison
Jake Thomson
Paul Rees
Danielle Perry
Alex James
Vicky Warham
Andy Westcott
Matthew Rudd
Louis Chadwick
Dan Black
Phil MacKenzie
Kevin Hingley
Loz Guest
Pete Bailey
Michelle Owen
Jon Jackson

See also
List of radio stations in the United Kingdom
Bauer Radio

References

External links 
 Official site
 Q Radio at Media UK
 QPM On Facebook
 Q Radio on Facebook
 Q Radio on Twitter

Digital-only radio stations
Bauer Radio
Defunct radio stations in the United Kingdom
Radio stations established in 2008
Radio stations disestablished in 2013